KWorld Computer Co. Ltd is a Taiwan-based technology company that specializes in TV tuner cards and boxes.  They are a consumer audio/video developer and provider whose market focus is PC based peripherals. The company offers analogue, digital, hybrid, satellite TV tuners, and video/audio capture/editing cards and boxes.

KWorld develops TV tuners for PAL, NTSC, and SECAM analogue television systems and for DVB-T, DVB-S, ISDB-T, DMB-T/H, ATSC, and IPTV digital television systems. KWorld also develops video capture/editing and audio capture/editing devices for both Macintosh and Microsoft Windows operating systems.

See also
 List of companies of Taiwan

References

1999 establishments in Taiwan
Electronics companies established in 1999
Computer hardware companies
Electronics companies of Taiwan
Taiwanese brands